Quest for Zhu is a 2011 American/Canadian direct-to-DVD animated action/adventure family film. It is the first full-length feature film based on the Zhu Zhu Pets franchise. It stars Canadian voice actors Mariah Wilkerson, Shannon Chan-Kent, Ian James Corlett, Sean Campbell, Erin Mathews, Jillian Michaels, Jan Rabson, and Kathleen Barr. The film was released on DVD September 27, 2011, then aired on Nickelodeon on December 4, 2011.

Synopsis
Pipsqueak (Shannon Chan-Kent) gets swept away to the other side of the Zhuniverse and heads off for an adventure with Mr. Squiggles (Ian Corlett), Chunk (Sean Campbell), and Num Nums (Erin Mathews). On their journey, they must do whatever it takes to overcome obstacles, find Zhu Fu (Jan Rabson), and defeat Mazhula (Kathleen Barr).

Cast
Mariah Wilkerson as Katie, Pipsqueak's owner
Shannon Chan-Kent as Pipsqueak
Ian Corlett as Mr. Squiggles; Stinker; and Zhuquasha, a large arctic mountain beast
Sean Campbell as Chunk
Erin Mathews as Num Nums and Surfer
Jillian Michaels as Jilly, a supporting Zhu cheer leader
Jan Rabson as Zhu Fu and Mangawanga
Zhu Fu: the ruler of Zhu overthroned by Mazhula
Mangawanga: a minor tribal Zhu character 
Kathleen Barr as Mazhula

Marketing

Soundtrack
The official Quest for Zhu soundtrack was released on November 21, 2011.

Video game
Coinciding with the film's release also on September 27, a Nintendo DS video game adaptation of the film was released in stores.

Awards 
In 2011, Quest for Zhu was nominated for a Golden Reel Award for Outstanding Achievement in Sound Editing – Non-Theatrical Animation Long Form. The winner was Megamind: The Button of Doom.

Sequels 
There was supposed to be 4 films with a second full-length feature film, The Power of Zhu, probably in the works and has a trailer, potentially being released on DVD sometime in 2012 as well as a third film The Secret of Zhu that featured the voices of Brad Garrett and Ken Jeong and Journey to GloE. However, as of February 2014, no other films or even plans for films have been released for "The Power of Zhu", although it was completed and was "secretly distributed" to TV stations in France and Brazil under the title "Amazing Adventures of Zhu".

See also
 The ZhuZhus, a 2016 television series also starring Pips/Nums/Squig/Chunk

References

External links
 
 
 Quest for Zhu on Rotten Tomatoes 
 Official Quest for Zhu Press Release 2011

2011 direct-to-video films
Direct-to-video animated films
American direct-to-video films
American children's animated adventure films
American children's animated fantasy films
Canadian animated feature films
Canadian direct-to-video films
Canadian animated fantasy films
Canadian children's animated films
Films scored by Michael Tavera
Universal Pictures direct-to-video films
Universal Pictures direct-to-video animated films
Animated films about mammals
Films about rodents
2010s English-language films
2010s American films
2010s Canadian films

fr:Zhu Zhu Pets#Film d'animation